Mariusz Jop  (born 3 August 1978) is a Polish professional football coach and a former defender. He is an assistant coach with Jagiellonia Białystok.

Club career
Born in Ostrowiec Świętokrzyski Jop started out playing for KSZO Ostrowiec Świętokrzyski. He won the Polish League Championship with Wisła Kraków in the 2000–01, 2002–03 and 2003–04 seasons. While playing in FC Moscow he became the first Pole to score a goal in the Russian Premier League. On 11 July 2009, he signed for Wisła Kraków as a free agent after terminating his contract with FC Moscow.

International career
Jop was selected to the 23-men national team for the 2006 FIFA World Cup finals in Germany. He was also included in the Polish Euro 2008 squad and made one appearance in a group match against Austria.

Managerial career
On 14 May 2021, Jop was announced the interim assistant for the Ekstraklasa side Wisła Kraków to the interim manager Kazimierz Kmiecik, after Peter Hyballa had finished his coaching duties.

Career statistics

Club

International

Honours
Wisła Kraków
 Ekstraklasa: 2000–01, 2002–03, 2003–04
 Polish Cup: 2001–02, 2002–03

References

External links

 
  
 

1978 births
Living people
People from Ostrowiec Świętokrzyski
Sportspeople from Świętokrzyskie Voivodeship
Polish footballers
Association football defenders
Poland international footballers
2006 FIFA World Cup players
UEFA Euro 2008 players
Ekstraklasa players
Russian Premier League players
KSZO Ostrowiec Świętokrzyski players
Wisła Kraków players
Widzew Łódź players
FC Moscow players
Górnik Zabrze players
Polish expatriate footballers
Polish expatriate sportspeople in Russia
Expatriate footballers in Russia